Bloodletting is the third studio album by American alternative rock band Concrete Blonde. Released on May 15, 1990, the album marks a shift for the band toward gothic rock. It features guest appearances by R.E.M.'s Peter Buck and Wall of Voodoo's Andy Prieboy.

Bloodletting peaked at number 8 on the Australian ARIA Charts and was certified gold in 1990. It earned a gold certification from the Recording Industry Association of America (RIAA) the following year.

Background 
Concrete Blonde lead vocalist Johnette Napolitano said of the album:
It was pretty miserable. It's not a happy little disc. We had a string of bad luck and [Bloodletting] was the tail end of it. A particularly bad relationship. It had never happened to me until I was 29 years old. I had a hard time getting over it. So, it's not a happy record, but I could do two things: I could make a self-indulgent record, which is what this is, or I could lock up all these songs in a closet and do something that wasn't sincere. This will never happen again, this record.

Release 
Bloodletting was released in May 15, 1990.

"Joey" was the band's biggest hit, reaching number one on the Modern Rock Tracks chart and the top 20 of the pop charts. The song reached #2 in Australia while also spending 6 weeks at #3.

Critical reception 
Elizabeth Wurtzel, in her review of the album for New York magazine, called the album "not nearly as likable or far-ranging" as the band's preceding album, Free, "though it's deeper and more focused."

2010 re-issue 
On July 13, 2010, Shout! Factory released the 20th anniversary edition of Bloodletting, featuring six bonus tracks: "I Want You", "Little Wing", the French extended version of "Bloodletting (The Vampire Song)" and live versions of "Roses Grow", "The Sky Is a Poisonous Garden" and "Tomorrow, Wendy".

Track listing

Personnel 

 Johnette Napolitano – vocals, bass guitar, production, album cover
 James Mankey – guitars, bass guitar, production, additional recording and mixing
 Paul Thompson – drums, production 
 
 Technical
 Chris Tsangarides – production, recording, engineering 
 Chris Marshall – production assistance 
 Earle Mankey and James Mankey – additional recording and mixing 
 Hugh Brown, Jim Yousling, Johnette Napolitano – album cover 
 
 
 
 Additional personnel
 Peter Buck – mandolin on "Darkening of the Light"
 Andy Prieboy – keyboards on "Tomorrow, Wendy"
 Gail Ann Dorsey – bass guitar on "Tomorrow, Wendy"
 Steve Wynn – vocals on "Bloodletting (the Vampire song)"
 John Keane – slide guitar on "Darkening of the Light" 
Peter and John recorded at John Keane Studio, Athens GA
 
 Additional notes
 This record is dedicated to Ron Scarselli with love.

Charts

Certifications

References

External links 
 

Bloodletting
Bloodletting
I.R.S. Records albums
Albums produced by Chris Tsangarides